Fie! Records is a record label founded by English singer-songwriter Peter Hammill, in 1992. The label's logo is the Greek letter phi (Φ), a pun on PH-I.

Releases

References

Record labels established in 1992
British record labels